CoCo Fresh Tea & Juice is a global bubble tea, or boba, drink franchise based in Taiwan. It was established in 1997 by Tommy Hung, the current chairman. CoCo has more than 4,500 locations in China, the U.S., Canada, France, Australia, the United Kingdom, Sweden the Philippines and Japan. Its taro milk tea was recommended by Eater.com. Some Hong Kong franchise owners stirred controversy by expressing their support for the Hong Kong protesters with slogans like "Add oil, Hongkongers" on customers' receipts in 2019.

Awards

References

1997 establishments in Taiwan
Tea companies of Taiwan
Bubble tea brands